Wow... The Story is a double album by Baby Cham, released on 24 October 2000, (see 2000 in music) and referred to by the Miami New Times as "the most anticipated album in years from any reggae artist.". The album serves as an introduction to Baby Cham, one of Jamaica's dancehall artists. The first disc has previously released titles while disc two has new material. Disc one includes "The Mass" and "Funny Man", as well as the popular hits such as "Ghetto Pledge" and "Can I get A". On disc two, Cham moves away from the traditional dancehall. This disc includes "High Roller", where Cham collaborates with the dancehall artist Shaggy.

Disc one

Disc two

Credits
Brian Gold - backing vocals
Tony Gold - backing vocals
Brian Thompson - vocals	
Christopher Birch - keyboards
Nigel Staff - keyboards
Bounty Killer - performer
Tony Kelly - producer, engineer
Rovleta Fraser - backing vocals	
Colin "The Captain" Hines - mixing
Claude "Weakhand" Reynolds - assistant engineer
Kirk Allen - assistant engineer
Dave Kelly - bass guitar, producer, engineer, drum programming, mixing, instrumentation
Baby Cham - main performer
Aisha Davis - backing vocals
Mario "Baddable" Gordon - assistant engineer
Delano "Baddable" McLaughlin  - assistant engineer
Sharpe Sherida - backing vocals
Sisco "Baddable" Wedderburn - assistant engineer
Roselyn Williams - backing vocals

Album singles

References 

2000 debut albums
Baby Cham albums
Madhouse Records albums